Nathan Straus Jr. (May 27, 1889 – September 13, 1961) was an American journalist and politician from New York.

Life
He was the son of Lina (née Gutherz) and Nathan Straus (1848–1931), co-owner of Macy's department store. He attended Princeton University, and Heidelberg University. He worked as a reporter for The New York Globe from 1909 to 1910; and was editor and publisher of Puck magazine from 1913 to 1917. During World War I he served as an ensign in the United States Navy.

After the war, he became Assistant Editor of the New York Globe, but left in 1920 because of the paper's support for Republican presidential candidate Warren G. Harding. Instead, he entered politics as a Democrat, and was a member of the New York State Senate (15th D.) from 1921 to 1926, sitting in the 144th, 145th, 146th, 147th, 148th and 149th New York State Legislatures. He was Chairman of the Committee on Agriculture from 1923 to 1924.

He was a founding trustee of the Palestine Endowment Fund, Inc. (1922) along with Julian Mack and Stephen Samuel Wise

He was New York State Administrator of the National Recovery Administration in 1934; a member of the New York City Housing Authority in 1936; and Administrator of the United States Housing Authority from 1937 to 1942. He published two books on housing issues: Seven Myths of Housing (1944), and Two-Thirds of a Nation – A Housing Program (1952).

Afterwards he was Chairman of the WMCA radio station until his death.

On September 13, 1961, he was found dead in a motel room in Massapequa, New York; and was buried at the Mount Pleasant Cemetery in Hawthorne, New York.

Personal life
He was married to Helen Sachs, daughter of Bernard Sachs, a noted neurologist for which Tay–Sachs disease is named and member of the Goldman-Sachs family. They had four sons: Nathan Straus III, Barnard Sachs Straus (married to Joan Paley), Irving Lehman Straus, and R. Peter Straus (1917–2012).  His son, R. Peter Straus, was Director of the Voice of America under President Jimmy Carter and the owner of radio station WMCA in New York City who in 1998, married Marcia Lewis, the mother of Monica Lewinsky.

Congressman Isidor Straus (1845–1912) and US Secretary of Commerce and Labor Oscar Straus (1850–1926) were Nathan's uncles; New York Chief Judge Irving Lehman (1876–1945) was his brother-in-law; and Ambassador Jesse I. Straus (1872–1936) was his first cousin.

Anne Frank connection

When Straus attended Heidelberg University in 1908, he met a young art-history scholar named Otto Frank. The 20 year old Frank accepted a job at Macy's, where he fell in love with New York and its brashness. But his father died in 1909, and he returned to Germany for a brief time.

Frank, who was Jewish, later fled Germany with his family in the face of the severe anti-Semitism of Nazi Germany. They relocated to Amsterdam, where Frank enlisted Nathan Jr.'s assistance to help his family obtain visas to relocate to the United States. Despite receiving help from Nathan Jr. and other connections, the Franks were unable to gather all the needed paperwork before Nazi Germany ordered US consulates to close in German-occupied territory (including the Netherlands). Ultimately, the entire Frank family was interned in Nazi concentration camps, with Otto the only member to survive to the end of World War II.

In the years that followed, Otto published the diary of his daughter, Anne Frank, which described the family's life while hiding from the Nazis in Amsterdam. That work, known in English as The Diary of a Young Girl or The Diary of Anne Frank, is one of the most well known books about The Holocaust. It has been translated into dozens of languages and adapted into plays and films.

References

 Nathan Straus, 72, Civic Leader And Chairman of WMCA, Dies in NYT on September 14, 1961 (subscription required)
 Straus family at Jewish Virtual Library

External links

 

1889 births
1961 deaths
American people of German-Jewish descent
Democratic Party New York (state) state senators
Politicians from Manhattan
Princeton University alumni
20th-century American newspaper editors
Jewish American journalists
Jewish American state legislators in New York (state)
United States Navy officers
20th-century American politicians
Journalists from New York City
Straus family